Cox & Clark Trading Post was an adobe building on the west shore of Tulare Lake.

Established in 1870 by the meat market and cattle business of Cox and Clark as a trading-post for the Indians it also served as a landing place for steamboats on the west side of the lake.  Cox & Clark held extensive holdings in Tulare, Kern, San Luis Obispo, Sutter, and Yuba counties, as well as in Lake County in Oregon.  In the vicinity of the trading post they owned land along the shoreline of Tulare Lake, where the tule marshes were pasture for cattle in dry years.

References

External links
 Tapestri's Site History: Federick Cox, Cattleman

Former populated places in California
Former settlements in Kings County, California
San Joaquin Valley
El Camino Viejo
1870 establishments in California